Thomas Francis Long (April 22, 1898 – September 16, 1973), nicknamed "Little Hawk", was a pitcher in Major League Baseball. He pitched in one game for the Brooklyn Robins on April 26, 1924, working two innings and allowing two earned runs to score.

External links

1898 births
1973 deaths
Baseball players from Memphis, Tennessee
Major League Baseball pitchers
Brooklyn Robins players
Mobile Sea Gulls players
Louisville Colonels (minor league) players
Mobile Bears players
Lincoln Links players